Sippar-Amnanum (modern Tell ed-Der in Baghdad Governorate, Iraq) was an ancient Near Eastern tell (hill city)  about 70 kilometers north of Babylon.

History
Sippar-Amnanum was the sister city (or suburb in some eyes) of Sippar. Though occupied from the Akkadian Period little is known of its history before the Old Babylonian period

The chief deity of Sippar-Amnanum was Annunitum, a warlike aspect of Ishtar favored by the Akkadians. She is the daughter of Enlil. According to the Cylinder of Nabonidus the temple Eulmash of Anunitu (Amnanum) was rebuilt by that Neo-Babylonian king. The cylinder also reports that the temple had earlier been built by Shagarakti-Shuriash, a king of the Kassite dynasty of Babylon. Presumably the temple had been destroyed in the interim by Shutruk-Nakhkhunte of Elam when he destroyed Sippar.

Note that there is some confusion on the city's name since Sinkashid, a king of Uruk, refers to himself in an inscription as "King of the Amnanum", where Amnanum is thought to be a tribal group.

Archaeology
The site of Tell ed-Der, along with Sippar, was excavated by Hormuzd Rassam in the early 1880s. Most of the tablets ended up in the British Museum. As was often the case in the early days of archaeology, excavation records were not made, particularly find spots. This makes it difficult to tell which tablets came from Sippar-Amnanum as opposed to Sippar. More Tell ed-Der tablets were purchased from locals by E. A. Wallis Budge while he was in the region after brief attempts to dig there. A sounding was conducted there in 1941 by the Directorate General of Antiquities of the Iraqi Government under the direction of Taha Baqir. Three hundred broken cuneiform tablets from the Old Babylonian period were found. Since the site is relatively close to Baghdad, it was a popular target for illegal excavations. More recently, Tell ed-Der was excavated between 1970 and 1985 by the Belgian Archaeological Expedition to Iraq.

The "House of Ur-Utu" was excavated in the mid-1970s. This residence, of the kalamahhum-priest of Annunitum, held around 2000 cuneiform tablets forming a household archive spanning several centuries. Most of the tablets were contemporary with the reigns of Ammisaduqa and Ammi-ditana of the First Babylonian dynasty.

The destruction of the house by fire helped preserve the tablets. Also found at Tell ed-Der were letters to another official, Ikunpisha, which were from kings Sumu-abum and Sumu-la-El of Babylon.

See also

 Cities of the ancient Near East
 Tell (archaeology)
Short chronology timeline

Notes

References
Rivkah Harris, Ancient Sippar: A Demographic Study of an Old Babylonian City (1894-1595 B.C.), Nederlands Historisch-Archaeologisch-Historisch Instituut te Istanbul, 1975
Dietz Otto Edzard, Altbabylonische Rechts-und Wirtschaftsurkunden aus Tell ed-Der im Iraq Museum, Baghdad, Bayerischen Akademie, 1970
L. De Meyer et al., Tell ed-Der: La vie en Babylonie il y a 4000 ans, Archeologia, no. 195,  pp. 8–25, 1984
L. De Meyer, Tell ed-Der, Tome II, Peeters, 1978, 
L. De Meyer, Tell ed-Der, Tome III, Peeters, 1980, 
L. De Meyer, Tell ed-Der, Tome IV, Peeters, 1984,

External links
Digital Sippar-Amnanum tablets at CDLI

1880s archaeological discoveries
Baghdad Governorate
Archaeological sites in Iraq
Former populated places in Iraq